Acantholipes canofusca is a species of moth in the family Erebidae first described by Hermann Heinrich Hacker and Aidas Saldaitis in 2010. It is found on Socotra, an island off Yemen.

References

canofusca
Moths described in 2010
Endemic fauna of Socotra
Moths of Asia